Dyego Rocha Coelho (born 22 March 1983) is a Brazilian professional football manager and former player. He Is currently in charge of Inter de Limeira.

Playing career
Born in São Paulo, Coelho was a Corinthians youth graduate. He made his first team – and Série A – debut on 3 July 2003, in a 2–0 home loss against Atlético Mineiro.

Coelho became an important unit of the club during the 2005 Campeonato Brasileiro Série A winning campaign, but after scoring an own goal in the 2006 Copa Libertadores, he eventually lost his starting spot. He was loaned to Atlético Mineiro in the 2007 season, being an undisputed starter and scoring seven goals in all competitions. In September of that year, Coelho was banned for 120 days after he elbowed Kerlon while he was doing his seal trick. However, his ban was reduced to five matches on appeal.

Returning to Timão for the 2008 campaign, Coelho was rarely used and rejoined Atlético on loan on 16 February of that year. On 1 July, he moved abroad for the first time in his career and joined Bologna on a one-year loan deal.

On 20 August 2009, Coelho returned to Galo on a permanent deal. Rarely used, he was released by the club on 18 June of the following year, and subsequently represented Karabükspor, Bahia, Guaratinguetá and Atlético Sorocaba. He retired with the latter in 2014, aged 31.

Coelho received his first international cap for the Brazil national team as a 61st-minute substitute for Adriano in a 0–1 defeat to Mexico in the Gold Cup Final, as Brazil used an under-23 squad to compete in the tournament. He also represented the under-20s in the 2003 FIFA U-20 World Cup, and the under-23s in the 2003 Pan American Games.

Managerial career
In 2015, shortly after retiring, Coelho returned to his first club Corinthians as the assistant of the under-20 squad. On 14 February 2017, as Osmar Loss was named Fábio Carille's assistant in the main squad, he took over the under-20s.

In November 2018, as Loss was named Guarani manager, Coelho was appointed assistant at the club. The following 15 April he returned to Corinthians, again as manager of the under-20s.

On 3 November 2019, Coelho was appointed interim manager of Corinthians, as Carille was sacked. He was again an interim in September 2020, in the place of Tiago Nunes.

Honours
Corinthians
 Campeonato Paulista: 2003
 Campeonato Brasileiro Série A: 2005
 
Atlético Mineiro
 Campeonato Mineiro: 2007, 2010

Bahia
 Campeonato Baiano: 2012

Brazil
 FIFA U-20 World Cup: 2003

References

External links
CBF profile 

1983 births
Footballers from São Paulo
Living people
Brazilian footballers
Brazilian football managers
Association football defenders
Brazilian expatriate footballers
Expatriate footballers in Italy
Expatriate footballers in Turkey
Campeonato Brasileiro Série A players
Campeonato Brasileiro Série A managers
Serie A players
Süper Lig players
2003 CONCACAF Gold Cup players
Brazil international footballers
Brazil under-20 international footballers
Sport Club Corinthians Paulista players
Clube Atlético Mineiro players
Bologna F.C. 1909 players
Kardemir Karabükspor footballers
Esporte Clube Bahia players
Guaratinguetá Futebol players
Clube Atlético Sorocaba players
Sport Club Corinthians Paulista managers
Pan American Games silver medalists for Brazil
Footballers at the 2003 Pan American Games
Medalists at the 2003 Pan American Games
Pan American Games medalists in football